Juozas is a Lithuanian masculine given name, a shortened version of Juozapas, which in turn is the equivalent of English Joseph.

List of people named Juozas

Juozas Adomaitis-Šernas (1859–1922), Lithuanian scientific writer and book smuggler during the Lithuanian press ban
Juozas Ambrazevičius (1903–1974), Lithuanian literary historian, better known for his political career and nationalistic views
Juozas Bagdonas (1911–2005), Lithuanian painter
Juozas Balčikonis (1885–1969), Lithuanian linguist and teacher, who helped standardize the Lithuanian language
Juozas Barzda-Bradauskas (1896–1953), Lithuanian Army brigadier genera
Juozas Bernatonis (born 1953), Lithuanian jurist and politician
Juozas Bernotas (born 1989), Lithuanian windsurfer
Juozas Budraitis (born 1940), Soviet and Lithuanian actor
Juozas Dringelis (born 1935), Lithuanian politician
Juozas Gabrys (1880–1951), Lithuanian politician and diplomat
Juozas Girnius (1915–1994), Lithuanian philosopher, existentialist
Juozas Glinskis (born 1933), Lithuanian playwright
Juozas Grušas (1901–1986), Lithuanian writer, editor, dramatist and playwright
Juozas Gruodis (1884–1948), Lithuanian composer, educator and professor
Juozas Imbrasas (born 1941), former mayor of Vilnius, Lithuania
Juozas Jagelavičius (1939–2000), Lithuanian rower
Juozas Jankus (1912–1999), Lithuanian painter
Juozas Jurgėla (1911–1961), Lithuanian basketball player
Juozas Kalinauskas (born 1935), Lithuanian sculptor and medalist
Juozas Kamarauskas (1874–1946), Lithuanian painter
Juozas Kaminskas (1898–1957), Lithuanian painter
Juozas Karvelis (born 1934), Lithuanian politician
Juozas Kazickas (born 1918), Lithuanian-American businessman and philanthropist
Juozas Kralikauskas (1910–2007), Lithuanian novelist and short story author
Juozas Lebednykas (born 1947), Lithuanian artist and sculptor
Juozas Lukša (1921–1951), one of the most prominent post-World War II resistance leaders in Lithuania
Juozas Maniušis (1910–1987), communist politician in Lithuanian
Juozas Miltinis (1907–1994), Lithuanian theatre director, founder of the Panevėžys Drama Theatre
Juozas Naujalis (1869–1934), Lithuanian composer, organist and choir conductor
Juozas Olekas (born 1955), Lithuanian surgeon and politician, Minister of National Defence
Juozas Paukštelis (1899–1981), Lithuanian author and translator
Juozas Petkevičius (born 1948), Lithuanian basketball coach
Juozas Rimas (born 1942), Lithuanian oboist and professor at the Lithuanian Academy of Music and Theatre
Juozapas Skvireckas (1873–1959), Lithuanian former Archbishop of Kaunas
Juozas Tūbelis (1882–1939), Lithuanian politician, Prime Minister, and member and chairman of the Lithuanian Nationalists Union
Juozas Tumas-Vaižgantas (1869–1933), Lithuanian writer, priest, social activist, literary historian, and founder of the Party of National Progress
Juozas Tunaitis (1928–2012), Roman Catholic titular bishop
Juozas Ūdras (1925–1991), Soviet Olympic fencer
Juozas Urbšys (1896–1991), Lithuanian diplomat, the last head of foreign affairs in independent interwar Lithuania, and a translator
Juozas Vilpišauskas (born 1899), Lithuanian cyclist and Olympic competitor
Juozas Vinča (1905–1990), Lithuanian boxer
Juozas Zikaras (1881–1944), Lithuanian sculptor and artist, created the design for pre-war Lithuanian litas coins
Juozas Žukas (born Joseph Zukas; 1915–1981), Lithuanian-American basketball and tennis player of the 1930s

Lithuanian masculine given names